Hohenleipisch (Sorbian: Lubuš) is a municipality in the Elbe-Elster district, in Brandenburg, Germany.

History 
Two kilometres west of Hohenleipisch is an old brown coal and quartz sand pit called Grube Gotthold.

From 1952 to 1990, Hohenleipisch was part of the Bezirk Cottbus of East Germany.

Demography

References

Localities in Elbe-Elster